Armand Romeo "Dutch" Delmonte (June 3, 1927 — April 7, 1981) was a Canadian professional ice hockey right winger who played in one National Hockey League game for the Boston Bruins during the 1945–46 season, on January 6, 1946 against the New York Rangers.

Del Monte also played for the St. Catharines Falcons from 1943 to 1945, Boston Olympics from 1945 to 1948, Los Angeles Monarchs from 1946 to 1947, St. Paul Saints from 1947 to 1951, Tacoma Rockets from 1951 to 1952, Cleveland Barons from 1952 to 1953, Ottawa Senators from 1953 to 1954, and the Marion Barons from 1953 to 1954.

Career statistics

Regular season and playoffs

See also
List of players who played only one game in the NHL

References

1927 births
1981 deaths
Boston Bruins players
Boston Olympics players
Canadian ice hockey right wingers
Cleveland Barons (1937–1973) players
Ice hockey people from Ontario
Los Angeles Monarchs players
Marion Barons players
Ottawa Senators (QSHL) players
Sportspeople from Timmins
St. Catharines Falcons (OHA) players
St. Paul Saints (USHL) players
Tacoma Rockets (WHL) players